Linden–South Historic District is a national historic district located in the South Wedge neighborhood of Rochester in Monroe County, New York. The district consists of 136 contributing buildings, including 82 residential buildings, 53 outbuildings, and one church.  The houses were constructed between 1872 and 1913 in a variety of vernacular interpretations of popular architectural styles including Gothic Revival, Italianate, Queen Anne, and Colonial Revival styles.  The houses are 2 1/2-stories, are of frame or brick construction, and were designed by local architects employed by the developer Ellwanger & Barry. Among the more prominent are Andrew Jackson Warner and Claude Bragdon. The church is the former South Avenue Baptist Church, now Holy Spirit Greek Orthodox Church, built in 1909–1910 in a Late Gothic Revival style.  Also in the district is a three-story, Queen Anne style mixed use building, with commercial space on the first floor and residential units above, located at 785 South Avenue (c. 1890).

The area was developed by George Ellwanger and his partner Patrick Barry after they entered the real estate business in 1856.  The district is located on the oldest part of the Ellwanger & Barry nursery, which they subdivided into residential lots and developed between 1872 and 1913.

It was listed on the National Register of Historic Places in 2009.

References

External links

Holy Spirit Greek Orthodox Church website

Residential buildings on the National Register of Historic Places in New York (state)
Gothic Revival architecture in New York (state)
Queen Anne architecture in New York (state)
Colonial Revival architecture in New York (state)
Historic districts in Rochester, New York
Historic districts on the National Register of Historic Places in New York (state)
National Register of Historic Places in Rochester, New York